Wilmot and Crampton Bay is an Arctic waterway in the Kitikmeot Region, Nunavut, Canada. It is located on the eastern edge of Queen Maud Gulf, running along the western coast of the Adelaide Peninsula, south of King William Island.

The area runs from Point A to Point B to Point C to Point D.

References

Bays of Kitikmeot Region
Franklin's lost expedition